Sergei Anatolievich Storchak (born 8 June 1954) is a Deputy Finance Minister of Russia. Storchak was born in Olevsk, Zhytomyr Oblast, Ukraine SSR, and became one of Russia's three deputy finance ministers in November 2005. He specialized in international financial relations, and was a prominent figure in negotiations over paying off Soviet-era debt. He negotiated Russia's repayment of its debt to the Paris Club of creditor nations, which it completed last year. In April 2009, he was charged with attempted fraud and embezzlement of state funds.

Fraud charges

Detention
On 15 November 2007, Storchak was detained by the Russian police as a part of a criminal investigation. "The detention took place outside the ministry. It may be related to criminal cases against a third party, not finance ministry officials," the ministry said in a statement. Prosecutors later confirmed the detention of Storchak and two businessmen on suspicion of "attempting large-scale embezzlement from the Russian state budget through fraud". In autumn 2009, he was released from custody and put on a travel ban.

Criminal investigation 
In April 2009, Storchak was charged with attempted fraud, 18 months after his detention. "It may be said without exaggeration that the best finance and economy experts, including the incumbent and former finance minister deputies, were involved in a plan in recent years to embezzle large amounts of state funds," said Alexander Bastrykin, the head of the Investigation Committee at the Prosecutor's Office. If convicted, Storchak faces between five and 10 years in prison.
On 31 January 2011, Russia's Investigative Committee announced that all charges had been dropped against Storchak, for lack of evidence.

Reactions 
Some analysts have speculated that Storchak's case may be a sign of power struggle within the Kremlin between free-market liberals like Russian Finance Minister Alexei Kudrin and conservative elements favoring a greater role for the state in the economy.

Notes

External links 
Ministry of Finance of Russia Official website

1954 births
Living people
People from Zhytomyr Oblast
Russian politicians